2,4,5-Trimethoxyphenethylamine (2C-O or 2C-OMe) or is a phenethylamine of the 2C family and was first synthesized by Jansen in 1931.  It is a positional isomer of the drug mescaline (3,4,5-trimethoxy).

Chemistry
2C-O is a member of a class of chemical compounds commonly known as phenethylamines.  Its full chemical name is 2-(2,4,5-trimethoxyphenyl)ethanamine; it is also known as 2,4,5-trimethoxyphenethylamine and 2,4,5-TMPEA.

Effects
Although not centrally active itself, 2C-O appeared to potentiate the action of mescaline when employed as pretreatment 45 minutes prior to the administration of mescaline.

Dangers
The toxicity of 2C-O is not known.

Law

Canada
As of October 31, 2016, 2C-O is a controlled substance (Schedule III) in Canada.

United States
2C-O is a Schedule I substance, as a positional isomer of mescaline.

United Kingdom
2C-O and all other compounds featured in PiHKAL are Class A drugs in the United Kingdom.

References

External links
2C-O Entry in PiHKAL
TMPEA Entry in PiHKAL • info

2C (psychedelics)